Bring It On Home may refer to:
Bring It On Home (album), a 2012 album by Joan Osborne
"Bring It On Home" (Sonny Boy Williamson II song), a 1963 blues song, later reworked by Led Zeppelin
"Bring It On Home" (Little Big Town song)
"Bring It On Home", a Kix Brooks song from New to This Town
"Bring It On Home to Me", a 1962 song first recorded by Sam Cooke